Premio Ruido (Spanish for "Noise Prize") was set up in October 2015 as a yearly single-category award for the best music album produced in Spain. The first ceremony to present the award took place in January 2016, after the nominees had been announced in November of the previous year.

In terms of the process followed and rules, Premio Ruido bears a close similarity to the Mercury Prize in the UK, and the intention is to recognise artistic quality over sales success, in contrast to previously existing awards. However, whilst the Mercury Prize is awarded by a mixed panel that includes both musicians and figures of the music industry, as well as members of the media and journalists, and was established by the British Phonographic Industry, Premio Ruido was established by Periodistas Asociados de Música (the Spanish Association of Music Journalists) and it is their members who take part in the selection. The company Virtual Contenidos SL manages and produces the annual awards, while PAM's Board of Directors conducts and ratifies the voting process.

At the initial stage, PAM members vote for their favourite national records launched that year. This is so as to draw a stylistically  diverse shortlist of twelve nominated albums. A recording is deemed "national" if at least half of the artists taking part are Spanish nationals or else have permanent residency in Spain. At the final stage, the associates vote for just one of the nominees. The winning artist is presented with a trophy.

El Niño de Elche was the inaugural winner with the album "Voces del extremo".

Winners and shortlisted nominees

See also 
 Mercury Prize (United Kingdom)
 Polaris Music Prize (Canadá)
 Shortlist Music Prize (United States)
 Choice Music Prize (Ireland)
 Irish Recorded Music Association
 Prix Constantin (France)
 Scottish Album of the Year Award (Scotland)
 Australian Music Prize (Australia)
 Nordic Music Prize (Scandinavian countries)

References

External links 
 https://web.archive.org/web/20180327155915/http://premioruido.es/  (In Spanish)
 https://web.archive.org/web/20160524125511/http://www.ninodeelche.net/Voces_del_Extremo_disco.html  (In Spanish)

Spanish music awards
Awards established in 2015